Unnati Hooda (born 20 September 2007) is an Indian badminton player. In 2022, she won the women's singles event at the Odisha Open. She was also part of India's 2022 Uber Cup team.

Career

2021–22
In 2021, Unnati Hooda's first tournament played was the India International Challenge where she lost to Anupama Upadhyaya in the finals. In January 2022, Unnati played in the 2022 Odisha Open where she won the tournament beating Smit Toshniwal in the finals, winning her first ever BWF World Tour tournament. She was a silver medalist at the 2022 Badminton Asia Junior U17 and U15 Championships held in Nonthaburi, Thailand in the U17 singles event.

Achievements

BWF World Tour (1 title) 
The BWF World Tour, which was announced on 19 March 2017 and implemented in 2018, is a series of elite badminton tournaments sanctioned by the Badminton World Federation (BWF). The BWF World Tour is divided into levels of World Tour Finals, Super 1000, Super 750, Super 500, Super 300 (part of the HSBC World Tour), and the BWF Tour Super 100.

Women's singles

BWF International Challenge (1 runner-up) 
Women's singles

  BWF International Challenge tournament
  BWF International Series tournament
  BWF Future Series tournament

BWF Junior International (1 runner-up) 
Girls' singles

  BWF Junior International Grand Prix tournament
  BWF Junior International Challenge tournament
  BWF Junior International Series tournament
  BWF Junior Future Series tournament

Performance timeline

National team 
 Junior level

 Senior level

Individual competitions 
 Junior level

 Senior level

References

External links 
 

Living people
2007 births
People from Rohtak
Racket sportspeople from Haryana
Sportswomen from Haryana
Indian female badminton players
21st-century Indian women